Emmerich am Rhein (Low Rhenish and ) is a city and municipality in the northwest of the German federal state of North Rhine-Westphalia. The city has a harbour and a quay at the Rhine. In terms of local government organization, it is a medium-sized city belonging to the district of Kleve in the administrative region (Regierungsbezirk) of Düsseldorf.

Geography
Emmerich lies on the north bank of the Rhine, just within the German borders; it is only 4 km to the Netherlands to the north and 5 km to the west. Therefore, it is the last German town on the Rhine before the river flows into the Netherlands.

Villages belonging to Emmerich am Rhein 
The populated places which comprise the municipality of Emmerich am Rhein are Emmerich, Borghees, Dornick, Elten, Hüthum, Klein-Netterden, Leegmeer, Praest, Speelberg and Vrasselt.

Neighboring municipalities and cities
To the north, the municipality of Emmerich borders the Dutch municipalities Montferland, Oude IJsselstreek and 's-Heerenberg; all of which are in the Dutch province of Gelderland. To the east, it is bordered by the German city of Rees. To the south, it is bordered by the Rhine, and south of this river, by the German city of Kleve. To the west, it is bordered by the Dutch municipalities of Rijnwaarden and Zevenaar, both of which are also in the Dutch province of Gelderland.

History
Emmerich, formerly called Embrika and Emrik, was originally a Roman colony. Around the year 700 Saint Willibrord founded the mission "Emmerich" in the Utrecht diocese. The oldest documented name is Villa Embrici, which survives from the year 828.

The collegiate church St. Martinikirche was constructed in 1040.

On 31 May 1233 Count Otto von Zutphen and Gelder arose to the royalty of the prosperous city with the authorization of the Roman Emperor Frederick II and the German King Henry (VII) Emmerich. In 1371 it fell to the Duchy of Cleves, and passed with it in 1609 to the Margraviate of Brandenburg. The town joined the Hanseatic League in 1407. In 1794 it was bombarded by the French under General Vandamme, and in 1806 it was assigned to the Duchy of Berg. It passed into the possession of Prussia in 1815.

In 1856 the railway section Oberhausen-Arnhem, of the Cologne-Mindener Railway was opened.

Emmerich was 91% destroyed on 7 October 1944 as a strategic bombing target of the Oil Campaign of World War II. In 1949, Elten was annexed by the Netherlands until 1963.

Since 1 February 2001 the city has officially been called Emmerich am Rhein, until then it was simply Emmerich.

On 28 November 2004 the four Catholic congregations of the city (St. Martini, St. Aldegundis, Heilig-Geist and Liebfrauen) combined to form the new city parish St. Christophorus.

Municipality and county reform
As a part of the 1st municipal restructuring program, the municipalities of Borghees, Dornick, Hüthum, Klein-Netterden, Praest and Vrasselt were integrated into the city of Emmerich on 1 July 1969. In the course of the 2nd restructuring program, the municipality of Elten was integrated as well, on 1 January 1975.

Places of interest

Rhine Promenade. Emmerich's Rhine promenade is a popular spot for locals and visitors alike, offering peaceful views across the Rhine river and Emmerich's iconic Rhine Bridge. Having undergone a complete refurbishment between 2003 - 2007, the 1 km long promenade also boasts a variety of restaurants, coffee shops and the Rheinpark with its playground.

Geistmarkt and Farmer's Market. Located in close proximity to the Rhine Promenade is the Geistmarkt, which hosts Emmerich's Farmer's Market every Wednesday and Saturday. Shoppers have a wide choice of fresh produce ranging from vegetables, fruits, fresh fish, meat, antipasti as well as flowers.

Steinstraße. Running adjacent to the Rhine Promenade, the Steinstraße is Emmerich's main shopping mile, boasting a number of shops. Recent refurbishments have also opened up opportunities for new business ventures that are looking for a new HQ.

Kaßstraße. Shoppers who are looking for additional shops and eateries can explore the Kaßstraße, which is a mere 5 minute walk from the Steinstraße.

Rhine Museum. In the Rhine Museum, 130 ship models are exhibited, as well as a radar unit, examples of fish taxidermy, maps of the Rhine, a historic Christophorus figurine and a library of the city's history. In addition there is a Biber submarine, a one-man U-boat from World War II and exhibitions regarding shipping on the Rhine, the history of the city and fisheries.

PAN-Art Forum/Poster Museum. The famous poster collection is displayed in the former Lohmann chocolate factory in rotating exhibits.

Aero Club Emmerich e.V.. Aviation fans and adrenalin junkies are encouraged to visit Emmerich's aero glider club 'Aero Club Emmerich e.V.'.

Holy Ghost Church This Catholic church was built in 1966 and is especially striking due to its version of the cross made of scrap metal and the Stations of the Cross made of linen. The architectural development during the time of the Second Vatican Council shaped the design of the church.

Rhine Bridge. This bridge, which connects Emmerich on the north of the Rhine with Kleve on the south, was opened in 1965, and with a length of 803 meters and a span of 500 meters it is the longest suspension bridge in Germany. Approximately 500 ships pass underneath it every day.

Castle Borghees. The manor house Borghees used as a cultural center was expanded in its present form in the mid-18th century. Borghees Castle became historically well known due to a love affair of the 17-year-old Katharina Rickers, the later imperial countess of Wartenberg, with the Prussian king Friedrich I.

Transport

Railways
Emmerich station is located about 1 km southeast of the city center on the double-track electrified "Holland Route," which plays an important role in passenger travel and commercial transport and is therefore treated in the EU as a part of the Trans-European Network in the category "priority projects which should be begun before 2010." In addition to the ICE International from Amsterdam to Frankfurt am Main, the night train CityNightLine to southern Germany, Austria and to Switzerland travels through here with a stop in Emmerich.

With regards to regional rail transport, the following trains pass through Emmerich, in general every hour:
the Rhein-Express (RE5) from Emmerich to Koblenz and
the Regional Train Der Weseler (RB35) from Emmerich to Duisburg, and at rush hour to Düsseldorf.

There is another station located on the same line near Emmerich, the stop Praest, which is only served by the Regional Train Der Weseler (RB 35).

Roads
Emmerich lies on the A3 motorway (known in German as the Bundesautobahn 3), which has the European designation E35. It also lies on the B8 (the Bundesstrasse 8) and the B220.

Inland waterways
 The Rhine
 The Municipal Rhine Harbour of Emmerich

Notable people
 Wilhelm Normann, the inventor of fat hardening by hydrogenation
 Albrecht Wolters (1822–1878), German Protestant theologian
 Anton de Waal (1837–1917), German Catholic priest, prelate, historian and author
 Friedrich Wilhelm Franz Nippold (1838–1918), German Protestant theologian
 Ernst Heinrich Göring (1839–1913), German jurist, Reichkommissar for German South-West Africa, father of the national socialist politician Hermann Göring
 Ernst Diehl (1874–1947), German classical philologist and epigraph
 Karl Scheele (1884–1966), German surgeon
Eugen Reintjes  (1884–1966), promotion of sport and health, Eugen Reintjes Stadion
 Eduard Künneke (1885–1953), German operetta composer
 Werner Müller (1907–1990), German ethnologist
 Ernst van Aaken (1910–1984), German sports physician and coach
 Gottfried Wolters (1910–1989), composer and choral leader
 Rainer Bonhof (born 1952), former Dutch-German footballer for the German national team
 Ulrich Surau (born 1952), German footballer
 Alexander Müller (born 1979), German racing driver
 Nico Hülkenberg (born 1987), Formula 1 driver, 2015 24 Hours of Le Mans winner and 2009 GP2 champion
 Robin Gosens (born 1994), German footballer

Twin towns – sister cities

Emmerich am Rhein is twinned with:
 King's Lynn, England, United Kingdom (1978)
 Šilutė, Lithuania (1990)
 Kirkland, Washington, United States (1995)

References

Populated places on the Rhine
Kleve (district)
Members of the Hanseatic League
Districts of the Rhine Province
Germany–Netherlands border crossings